Cochemiea macdougallii is a species of cactus in the genus Cochemiea. The plant has a greenish-gray epidermis and black spines. It is only known from Oaxaca, Mexico.

Taxonomy
The species was first described in 1961 by Edward Johnston Alexander as Ortegocactus macdougallii. It was the only species in Alexander's genus Ortegocactus. Ortegocactus was later synonymized with Cochemiea, but a name in that genus was only provided in 2021.

References 

macdougallii
Flora of Oaxaca
Plants described in 1961